Riechia is a genus of moths within the family Castniidae containing only one species, Riechia acraeoides, which is found in Peru, Paraguay, Brazil and Argentina.

Subspecies
Riechia acraeoides acraeoides (Peru, Brazil, Argentina)
Riechia acraeoides diffusa (Lathy, 1923) (Brazil)

References

External links

Castniidae
Monotypic moth genera
Moths of South America
Moths described in 1832